The New York State Convention of Colored Citizens was a series of colored convention events active from 1840 until 1891 in various cities in New York state. The convention was one of several social movement conventions that took place in the mid-19th century in many states across the United States.

Description 
The Albany convention was held on August 18–20, 1840, and discussed a number of topics including politics, race relations, and the state of African-American businesses.

The 1857 New York State Convention of Colored Citizens was held on September 23–24, 1857 at Spring Street Hall in New York City, with chair Rev. James Scott, and secretary W. J. Watkins. Topics varied and included ending slavery with a focus on southern states, and current issues facing Black Americans in New York state. Attendees of the 1857 event included abolitionist Jeremiah Powers, Willis Augustus Hodges, and Rev. Henry Highland Garnet.

New York state held a many national conventions (including in New York City, Buffalo, Troy, and Rochester); including the Buffalo convention in 1843, and the Troy convention in 1847. The 1853 National Convention of the Free People of Color in Rochester was attended by Stephen Smith, who was an abolitionist also active in the Pennsylvania conventions.

List of related events

State events

National events

See also 
 California State Convention of Colored Citizens
 Pennsylvania State Equal Rights League Convention

References 

1840 in New York (state)
History of African-American civil rights
Colored Conventions
1840 establishments in New York (state)
1891 disestablishments in New York (state)
African Americans' rights organizations
Abolitionist conventions in the United States